Fredrik Nordback (born 20 March 1979) is a Finnish former footballer who played the majority of his career for Örebro SK.

Career
Nordback made his senior debut for Örebro SK in 1997, two years after arriving from Hangö IK. He played over 130 Allsvenskan games for Örebro and he was the team captain for a time.

External links
 
  

1979 births
Living people
People from Hanko
Finnish footballers
Finland international footballers
Örebro SK players
Allsvenskan players
Superettan players
Finnish expatriate footballers
Expatriate footballers in Sweden
Finnish expatriate sportspeople in Sweden
Swedish-speaking Finns
Hangö IK players
Association football midfielders
Sportspeople from Uusimaa